Eve is the first woman created by God according to the creation narrative of Abrahamic religions.

Eve or EVE may also refer to:

People 

 Eve (rapper) (born 1978), American recording artist and actress
 Eve (Japanese singer) (born 1995), a Vocaloid producer and Japanese singer-songwriter.

Places 
 Eve Cone, a volcano in British Columbia, Canada
 Ève, Oise, a commune in the Oise département of France
 Eve, Kentucky, an unincorporated community
 Eve, Missouri, an unincorporated community

Technology 
 Eve (cryptography), a placeholder name for an archetypal eavesdropper
 EVE/ZeBu, a provider of hardware-assisted verification tools
 Eve (robot), a robot scientist working at Aberystwyth University
 EVE (text editor), a text editor provided with the VMS operating system
 VMS Eve, a spacecraft
 European Venus Explorer, a proposed space probe
 Eve, a typeface created by Rudolf Koch
 Eve Systems, German smart home product brand and manufacturer

Books and magazines
 Eve (magazine), a monthly women's magazine
 Eve (Chase novel), a 1945 psychological thriller novel by James Hadley Chase
 Eve (Young novel), a 2015 Christian fantasy novel by William P. Young

Film and television 
 Eve (1968 film), a thriller film
 Eve (2008 film), a short film by Natalie Portman
 Eve (American TV series), a 2003–2006 American television sitcom
 Eve (British TV series), a 2015–2017 British children's TV programme
 "Eve" (The X-Files), a 1993 episode of The X-Files
 "Eve", an episode of Journey to the Unknown
 Eve (South Korean TV series), a 2022 South Korean TV series

Fictional characters and items
 Eve (Angel), a character in the Joss Whedon TV series Angel
 Eve (Black Cat), a character in the 2000–2004 manga series Black Cat
 Eve (comics), a character in the Neil Gaiman comic book series The Sandman
 Eve (The X-Files), the name of multiple female clones in the TV series The X-Files
 EVE (WALL-E), a character in the 2008 Pixar film WALL-E
 Eve (Xena), a character in the TV series Xena: Warrior Princess
 Eve, a member of the musical comedy trio The Kransky Sisters
 Eve, a character in the Species film series
 Eve, a character in the Underworld film series
 Eve, a fictional serum in the 2007 video game BioShock
 Eve Luciano, a character in the 1978–1981 manga series California Story
 Eve Polastri, a character in the 2018— TV series Killing Eve and related Luke Jennings novels
 EVE VIII, a character in the 1991 film Eve of Destruction
 Eve Wakamiya, the keyboardist of the band Pastel*Palettes in the BanG Dream! franchise
 Eve, a character in the 1995 novel Parasite Eve byHideaki Sena
 Eve, a character in The Binding of Isaac
 Eve, a character in Freedom Force
 EVE (Sonic the Hedgehog), a character in Sonic the Hedgehog comic books
 Eve, a character in the 2012 video game Mass Effect 3
 Eve, a character in Season 6 of the series Supernatural

Games 
 Eve: The Second Genesis Collectible Card Game
 Eve Online, a 2003 MMO space simulation computer game
 Peter Gabriel: Eve, a video game created in association with and featuring the music of Peter Gabriel
 Stellar Blade, initially revealed as Project Eve

Music 
 Ève (Massenet), a French biblical oratorio by Jules Massenet

Bands
 Eve (American band) or Honey Ltd.
 Eve (Korean band), a Korean visual rock band

Albums
 Eve (The Alan Parsons Project album) (1979)
 Eve (Over the Rhine album) (1994)
 Eve (Showta album), a 2008 album by Showta
 Eve, a 2010 album by Ufomammut
Eve (Rapsody album), a 2019 album by Rapsody

Songs
 "Eve" (Jim Capaldi song), 1972
 "Eve" (Idoling!!! song), 2010
 "Eve", song by The Carpenters from Ticket to Ride, 1969
 "Eve", song by Dream Theater from Awake, 1994
 "Eve", song by Spacek, 1999
 "Eve", song by Asking Alexandria from Asking Alexandria, 2017
 "Ève lève-toi", by Julie Pietri, 1986

Other uses
 Mitochondrial Eve, the matrilineal most recent common ancestor of modern humans
 Eve (cigarette), a brand of cigarette
 EVE (organization), a Vancouver-based advocacy group
 Eve (Davidson), a 1931 bronze sculpture by Robert Davidson
 Endogenous viral element
 3,4-Methylenedioxy-N-ethylamphetamine or Eve, an empathogenic psychoactive drug
 Harstad/Narvik Airport, Evenes's IATA code
 The day or night before a special day, usually a holiday, for example Christmas Eve
 NIO Eve, a concept car made by the automotive brand NIO.

See also
 Eaves
 Eevee, a Pokémon
 Eevee (band), a Philippine band formed in 2004
 Eve 6, a Californian rock band
 Evening
 Evette (disambiguation)
 Evi (disambiguation)
 Evie (disambiguation)
 Evy (disambiguation)
 Ewe language or Eve
 First woman (disambiguation)
 Ive (disambiguation)
 Yve
 Yves (disambiguation)

ko:이브